Metropolitan Philaret (born Kirill Varfolomeyevich Vakhromeev, ; 21 March 1935 in Moscow – 12 January 2021 in Minsk) was the emeritus Metropolitan of Minsk and Slutsk, the Patriarchal Exarch of All Belarus and the leader of the Belarusian Orthodox Church that is an autonomous part of the Russian Orthodox Church. He resigned on 25 December 2013, and was succeeded by Metropolitan Pavel .

Biography
Born in 1935 in Moscow, RSFSR, Kirill attended the Moscow Theological Academy in 1954 after spending a year in the seminary. During the course of his studies, he chose the name Filaret when he received the monastic tonsure in 1959.  Two years later, he graduated from the academy with a doctorate in theology. After serving in Minsk, Kaliningrad and Moscow, Filaret was appointed Metropolitan of Minsk and the entire Belarusian SSR in 1978.

In 1989, as the collapse of the Soviet Union was imminent, Filaret was appointed to become the patriarchal exarch of the new country of Belarus. He also served a short term in the Supreme Council of Belarusian SSR as a people's deputy.

In 2006, for his work in the Russian Orthodox Church he was awarded the title Hero of Belarus by President Alexander Lukashenko.

The KGB recruited Filaret as an agent some time before 1969, assigning him the code name Ostrovsky.

He died on 12 January 2021, after being hospitalized with COVID-19 during the COVID-19 pandemic in Belarus. Cardinal Kurt Koch of the Catholic Church sent a letter of condolences to Patriarchal Exarch Metropolitan Veniamin. Koch said that Philaret had made a significant imprint on the church of Belarus, such as "the rebirth of ecclesial life, ... the renewal and construction of new churches and monasteries, and ... the development of religious instruction and educational programs". Catholic Archbishop Emeritus of Minsk, Tadevuš Kandrusievič, has pledged to celebrate a Mass in honor of Philaret.

On May 3, 2022, a monument to Metropolitan Filaret has been unveiled near the Holy Spirit Cathedral in Minsk. Attending the ceremony was Belarusian President Alexander Lukashenko.

References

1935 births
2021 deaths
Clergy from Moscow
Clergy from Minsk
Bishops of the Belarusian Orthodox Church
Belarusian people of Russian descent
Eastern Orthodox Christians from Belarus
Christian Peace Conference members
National Heroes of Belarus
Deaths from the COVID-19 pandemic in Belarus